Tokarev is a Russian surname.

Tokarev may also refer to:
 Rage (2014 film), a 2014 American thriller film known as Tokarev in Europe
 Tokarev, Astrakhan Oblast, a rural locality in Russia
 TT pistol, a Russian semi-automatic pistol
 7.62×25mm Tokarev, the cartridge used in most TT pistols